Fly High may refer to:

 Fly High (film) or Flight, a 2009 South Korean film

Music

Albums 
 Fly High (album) or the title song, by Me & My, 2001
 Fly High (EP) or a track on the EP, by Infinite H, 2013

Songs 
 "Fly High" (Ayumi Hamasaki song), 2000
 "Fly High", by Bridget St John from Songs for the Gentle Man
 "Fly High", by the Mad Capsule Markets from 010
 "Fly High", by Shaggy from Rise
 "Fly High", by Slushii from Out of Light
 "Fly High", by W-inds
 "Flyhigh", by Soulfly from Primitive

See also 
 Flying High (disambiguation)